WRSH (91.1 FM) is a radio station broadcasting an Educational format. Licensed to Rockingham, North Carolina, United States.  The station is currently owned by Richmond County Board of Education.

External links

RSH